Haunted Dancehall is the second studio album by English electronic music group The Sabres of Paradise. It was released through Warp on 28 November 1994. It peaked at number 57 on the UK Albums Chart.

Critical reception

NME named Haunted Dancehall the 47th best album of 1994. In 2007, Haunted Dancehall was included in The Guardians list of "1000 albums to hear before you die", with an accompanying write-up citing it as "techno's first concept album". It was also included in the book 1001 Albums You Must Hear Before You Die.

Track listing

Personnel
Credits adapted from liner notes.

 Andrew Weatherall – production, mixing
 Jagz Kooner – production, mixing
 Gary Burns – production, mixing
 Portishead – additional production (5)
 Scruff – additional production (6)
 MadArk – artwork

Charts

References

External links
 

1994 albums
Warp (record label) albums
The Sabres of Paradise albums
Albums produced by Andrew Weatherall